() (also styled TOEI) is a Japanese film, television production, and distribution and video game developer and publishing company. Based in Tokyo, Toei owns and operates 34 movie theaters across Japan (all but two of them operated by its subsidiary, T-Joy), studios at Tokyo and Kyoto; and is a shareholder in several television companies. It is notable for creating animated programming known as anime, and live action dramas known as tokusatsu which use special visual effects. It also creates historical dramas (jidaigeki). Outside Japan, it is known as the controlling shareholder of Toei Animation and the owner of the Kamen Rider and Super Sentai franchises.

Toei is one of the four members of the Motion Picture Producers Association of Japan (MPPAJ), and is therefore one of Japan's Big Four film studios.

The name "Toei" is derived from the company's former name .

History 
It had erected its facilities immediately east of the Tōkyū Tōyoko Line; they managed the Tōkyū Shibuya Yokohama studio system prior to V-J Day. From 1945 through the Toei merger, Tokyo-Yokohama Films leased from the Daiei Motion Picture Company a second studio in Kyoto.

On October 1, 1950, the Tokyo Film Distribution Company was incorporated as a subsidiary of Toyoko Eiga; in 1951 the company purchased Ōizumi Films. The current iteration of Toei was established on April 1, 1951. Through the merger, they gained the combined talents and experience of actors Chiezō Kataoka, Utaemon Ichikawa, Ryunosuke Tsukigata, Ryūtarō Ōtomo, Kinnosuke Nakamura, Chiyonosuke Azuma, Shirunosuke Toshin, Hashizo Okawa, and Satomi Oka.

In 1955, they purchased the Kyoto studio from Daiei. Toei was a pioneer in the use of "Henshin"/"character transformation" in live-action martial-arts dramas, a technique developed for the Kamen Rider, Metal Hero and Super Sentai series; the genre currently continues with Kamen Rider and Super Sentai.

In September 1964, Toei leaves the Tokyu Corporation.

In 1972, Toei started to distribute foreign films in Japan. 

In 1975, they opened a theme park at Kyoto Studio, the Toei Kyoto Studio Park.

Toei films
Toei started producing films in 1953. This list compiles the films by their original release date, their common English titles and Japanese titles. The Japanese titles are not necessarily direct translations of their English counterparts.

For feature films, Toei established itself as a producer of B-movies, that were made to fit into double bills and triple bills. It is predominantly known in the west for its series of action films and television series.

Toei animation films

Toei produced/distributed shows

Video games
 Ninja Hayate (1984)
 Time Gal (1985)
 The Masked Rider: Kamen Rider ZO (1994)
 Chameleon Twist (1997)
 Chameleon Twist 2 (1998)

Saburo Yatsude

 is a collective pseudonym used by Toei Company television producers, and formerly Toei Animation producers, when contributing to their various anime and tokusatsu series; similar to Sunrise's Hajime Yatate. The use of the pen name began with The Kagestar and has been used throughout the Super Sentai (in the adapted Power Rangers series starting with Ninja Storm, the credits list Saburo Hatte. Before this, the credits listed "Original Concepts by Saburo Yatsude") and Metal Hero Series as well as for Spider-Man, Choukou Senshi Changéríon, Video Warrior Laserion, Chōdenji Robo Combattler V, Chōdenji Machine Voltes V, Tōshō Daimos, Daltanius, Space Emperor God Sigma, Beast King GoLion and Kikou Kantai Dairugger XV.  The name is also used as a contributor to the soundtracks for the series.

Toei Animation stopped using Saburo Yatsude in 1999, and they began to use Izumi Todo instead. The first anime that was created by Izumi Todo was Ojamajo Doremi.

In the Unofficial Sentai Akibaranger series, Saburo Hatte is an actual person who is godlike within the fictional reality that the show takes place in. In fact, his hand appears at the end of the first half of the series to cover the camera lens and end the show, later having the second half be made under Malseena's influence while in the hospital in the real world.

In the Doubutsu Sentai Zyuohger spinoff, Super Animal War'''s third episode, he is portrayed by Jun Hikasa.

On April 3, 2016, an unknown Toei staff member going by Saburo Yatsude was interviewed while wearing a "Giraffe Zyuman" mask in reference to Zyuohger.

Original creator
Live action
 The Kagestar (1976-1977)
 Ninja Captor (1976-1977)
 Spider-Man (1978-1979)
 Super Sentai (1979–present)
 Metal Hero Series (1982-1999)
 Choukou Senshi Changéríon (1996)
 Unofficial Sentai Akibaranger (2012-2013)

Anime
 Robot Romance Trilogy (1976-1979)
 Future Robot Daltanious (1979-1980)
 Space Emperor God Sigma (1980-1981)
 Beast King GoLion (1981-1982)
 Armored Fleet Dairugger XV (1982-1983)
 Lightspeed Electroid Albegas (1983-1984)
 Video Warrior Laserion (1984-1985)

Script
Television
 Sore Kara no Musashi (1964-1965)
 Mito Kōmon (1964-1965)
 Tensou Sentai Goseiger (2010)
 Kikai Sentai Zenkaiger (2021)
 Avataro Sentai Donbrothers (2022)

Web series
 From Episode of Stinger - Uchu Sentai Kyuranger: High School Wars (2017)
 Kikai Sentai Zenkaiger Spin-Off: Zenkai Red Great Introduction! (2021)
 Avataro Sentai Donbrothers Meets Kamen Rider Den-O: Aim! Don-O (2022)

Director
 Nebula Mask Machineman (1984)

See also

 Toho
 Shintoho
 Tsuburaya Productions
 Daiei Film
 Kadokawa Daiei Studio
 Kadokawa Shoten
 Nikkatsu
 Shochiku
 Gainax
 Group TAC
 Production I.G
 Studio Ghibli
 Sony Music Entertainment (Japan) Inc.
 Sega Enterprises
 TV Tokyo
 Tatsunoko Pro
 Topcraft
 Toei Animation
 Toei Superheroes
 Toei Fushigi Comedy Series

References
Footnotes

Sources

 
 
 

External links

 Toei webpage
 
 
 
 
  - a Hollywood Reporter'' article detailing Toei's receiving MIPTV's Lifetime Achievement Award in 2006

 
Companies listed on the Tokyo Stock Exchange
Japanese companies established in 1950
Anime companies
Mass media companies based in Tokyo
Companies listed on the Osaka Exchange
Film distributors of Japan
Japanese film studios
International sales agents
Mass media companies established in 1950
Television production companies of Japan
Japanese brands
Video game companies of Japan
Video game development companies
Video game publishers